William Alexander Miller (1879–1957) was a professional baseball player. He played in one game in Major League Baseball for the Pittsburgh Pirates as a right fielder.

External links

Major League Baseball outfielders
Pittsburgh Pirates players
Major League Baseball players from Germany
1879 births
1957 deaths
People from Bad Schwalbach
Sportspeople from Darmstadt (region)
German emigrants to the United States